Leucine-rich, glioma inactivated 1, also known as LGI1, is a protein which in humans is encoded by the LGI1 gene. It may be a metastasis suppressor.

Function 

The leucine-rich glioma inactivated -1 gene is rearranged as a result of translocations in glioblastoma cell lines. The protein contains a hydrophobic segment representing a putative transmembrane domain with the amino terminus located outside the cell. It also contains leucine-rich repeats with conserved cysteine-rich flanking sequences. This gene is predominantly expressed in neural tissues and its expression is reduced in low grade brain tumors and significantly reduced or absent in malignant gliomas.

Clinical significance

Since its earliest discovery, the LGI1 gene has been implicated in the control of cancer metastasis and in a predisposition to epilepsy. Following genetic linkage studies placing the hereditary form of autosomal dominant partial epilepsy with auditory features (ADPEAF) on chromosome region 10q24 mutation analysis of affected members in these families demonstrated LGI1 was a major cause of the disease.

More recently, LGI1 has been shown to be the major target of human autoantibodies which immunoprecipitate voltage-gated potassium channel complexes from mammalian brain tissue. LGI1 antibodies are found in patients with limbic encephalitis and in patients with faciobrachial dystonic seizures (FBDS). FBDS are a recently described form of epilepsy which is characterized by frequent, brief seizures which affect the arm and face. They appear to be preferentially responsive to immunotherapy over anti-epileptic drugs.

Interactions 

LGI1 has been shown to interact with ADAM22, and DLG4.

References

Further reading

External links 
  GeneReviews/NCBI/NIH/UW entry on Autosomal Dominant Partial Epilepsy with Auditory Features